Leontiniidae is an extinct family comprising eighteen genera of notoungulate mammals known from the Middle Eocene (Mustersan) to Late Miocene (Huayquerian) of South America.

References

Further reading 
 M. V. Deraco, J. E. Powell, and G. Lopez. 2008. Primer leontínido (Mammalia, Notoungulata) de la Formación Lumbrera (Subgrupo Santa Bárbara, Grupo Salta-Paleógeno) del noroeste argentino. Ameghiniana 45(1):83–91
 McKenna, Malcolm C., and Bell, Susan K. 1997. Classification of Mammals Above the Species Level. Columbia University Press, New York, 631 pp. 
 B. J. Shockey, J. J. Flynn, D. A. Croft, P. Gans, and A. R. Wyss. 2012. New leontiniid Notoungulata (Mammalia) from Chile and Argentina: comparative anatomy, character analysis, and phylogenetic hypotheses. American Museum Novitates 3737:1–64
 A. R. Wyss, J. J. Flynn, and D. A. Croft. 2018. New Paleogene Notohippids and Leontiniids (Toxodontia; Notoungulata; Mammalia) from the Early Oligocene Tinguiririca Fauna of the Andean Main Range, Central Chile. American Museum Novitates 3903:1–42

Toxodonts
Eocene mammals
Oligocene mammals
Miocene mammals of South America
Eocene first appearances
Miocene extinctions
Fossil taxa described in 1895
Taxa named by Florentino Ameghino
Prehistoric mammal families